Madhya Pradesh Cricket Association Ground is a multi-purpose stadium in Sagar, Madhya Pradesh. The ground is mainly used for organizing matches of football, cricket and other sports. The ground has floodlights so that the stadium can host day-night matches. It was made considering all norms of BCCI so that Ranji Trophy matches can be played. The stadium was established in 2010 when the stadium hosted a match of Maharaja Yeshwant Rao Memorial Inter Divisional Tournament 2010/11 between Sagar and Gwalior.

References

External links 
 cricketarchive
 MPCA

Sagar, Madhya Pradesh
Cricket grounds in Madhya Pradesh
Buildings and structures in Madhya Pradesh
Sports venues in Madhya Pradesh
Sports venues completed in 2010
2010 establishments in Madhya Pradesh